The Indian Journal of Medical Sciences is a quarterly peer-reviewed open access medical journal published by Scientific Scholar LLC. The journal was previously published by Medip Academy on behalf of the Indian Journal of Medical Sciences Foundation. Medip Academy was listed on Beall's list before it was taken down in 2017. It covers clinical medicine, surgery, pharmaceutical, and basic medical sciences with emphasis on health problems and solutions relating to clinicians from the developing world. The editor-in-chief is Ashish Gulia.

Abstracting and indexing 
The journal is indexed in Abstracts on Hygiene and Communicable Diseases, Bioline International, CAB Abstracts, CINAHL, EBSCO, Excerpta Medica/EMBASE, Expanded Academic ASAP, Global Health, SafetyLit, and Tropical Diseases Bulletin.

References

External links 
 

Open access journals
Monthly journals
English-language journals
Publications established in 1947
General medical journals
1947 establishments in India